A secant plane is a plane containing a nontrivial section of a sphere or an ellipsoid, or such a plane that a sphere is projected onto. Secant planes are similar to tangent planes, which contact the sphere's surface at a point, while secant planes contact the surface along curves.

The two-dimensional representations of secant planes are secant lines, the lines that join two distinct points on a curve.

Applications 

Secant planes are used in map projections. The secant plane intersects a globe along a small circle with no distortion, forming a standard parallel which has true scale.

See also 
 Circular section
 Circular segment
 Spherical cap
 Tangent space

References

External links 
 Tangents and Secants in Map Projections

Planes (geometry)